The Ontario West Shore Railway is a historic railway that operated in Ontario, Canada.

The company started construction on a railway line between Goderich and Kincardine in the early 1900s, but the line was never completed.  The company's president was J. W. Moyes of Toronto, Ontario. Moyes was neither wealthy nor a railroad man.

Huron, Bruce and Grey Electric Railway
In 1902, Moyes incorporated the Huron, Bruce and Grey Electric Railway and proceeded to lobby local municipalities for capital. He asked the town of Goderich for $50,000, the township of Ashfield for $50,000 and $25,000 each from Colbourne and West Wawanosh townships.

The initial scheme was to build a railroad from Goderich to Dunlop. From Dunlop, the line was to split with one branch to Amberley and another to Dungannon. A third branch would be built from Saltford to Blyth. Freight and daily passenger service would operate on all lines.

Each municipality held a vote on the scheme. Goderich approved the $50,000 investment, but the townships rejected the plan.

Goderich to Kincardine
In 1906, after the company was renamed the Ontario West Shore Railway, the municipalities provided funding for a single line extending from Goderich to Kincardine.  Goderich commits $150,000, Kincardine $50,000, and the townships commit money as well.

In 1908, work on the track is started in Port Albert. By the end of summer 1911, the railroad was completed from Goderich to Kintail.  At that point, one car of freight per day, mostly grain, was being loaded along the track.

In January, 1912, the company defaulted on their bonds to the municipalities. The line was never completed.

See also

 List of Ontario railways
 List of defunct Canadian railways

References

Defunct Ontario railways
Railway companies established in 1902
Railway companies disestablished in 1912